Goitom is a masculine given name with origins in Eritrea. It may refer to:

Goitom Kifle (born 1993), Eritrean long-distance runner
Henok Goitom (born 1984), Eritrean football striker
Merhawi Goitom (born 1996), Eritrean racing cyclist
Testfaldet Goitom, Eritrean football midfielder

African masculine given names